RAK Studios is a recording studio complex, with residential facilities located, used by Rak Records, near Regent's Park in central London, England. It was founded in 1976 by English record producer Mickie Most. RAK has four recording rooms. Studios 1 and  2 house API mixing consoles; Studio 3 has a vintage Neve VRP Legend console (previously at Abbey Road Studios' Studio 2); and Studio 4 contains an SSL 4056 console.

The RAK complex was a Victorian school and church hall.

Notable songs recorded at RAK Studios

”In a Big Country” – Big Country
"Bigmouth Strikes Again" – The Smiths
"Down in the Tube Station at Midnight" – The Jam
"Everyone's a Winner" – Hot Chocolate
”Fairytale of New York” – The Pogues
"Hold Me Now" – Thompson Twins
"Kids in America" – Kim Wilde  
"Living Next Door to Alice" – Smokie
"Pretty in Pink" – The Psychedelic Furs
"Shattered Dreams" – Johnny Hates Jazz
"Some Girls" – Racey
"Iron Deer Dream" – Fixers
"Vienna" – Ultravox
"When Love Breaks Down" – Prefab Sprout
"Histórias e Bicicletas" – Oficina G3

References

External links
 RAK Studios — official site

Recording studios in London